Nowe Szepietowo Podleśne  is a village in the administrative district of Gmina Szepietowo, within Wysokie Mazowieckie County, Podlaskie Voivodeship, in north-eastern Poland.

References

Villages in Wysokie Mazowieckie County